Oliver Martin Conmy (13 November 1939 – 26 January 2014) was a former footballer who played as a winger in the 1960s and 1970s.

Although born in Ireland, he was just nine years old when his parents left County Mayo to live in Dewsbury, Yorkshire, where he was spotted by Huddersfield Town playing for St Paulinus Youth Club.

He played in The Football League for Huddersfield Town and Peterborough United, making over 250 league appearances with Peterborough, and he later played for Cambridge City.

Conmy was capped five times in total for the Republic of Ireland national football team at senior level.

He died aged 74 on 26 January 2014 at his Southport home, following a long illness.

References

 The Complete Who's Who of Irish International Football, 1945-96 (1996):Stephen McGarrigle

1939 births
2014 deaths
Republic of Ireland association footballers
Association football forwards
Association footballers from County Mayo
English Football League players
Huddersfield Town A.F.C. players
Peterborough United F.C. players
Cambridge City F.C. players
Republic of Ireland international footballers